Shadows of the Orient is a 1935 American film directed by Burt P. Lynwood.

Premise 

Pre World War II action yarn centering on the efforts of law enforcement officers trying to track down the head of a smuggling ring operating out of the 'shadows' of Chinatown.

Cast 
Esther Ralston as Viola Avery
Regis Toomey as Inspector Bob Baxter
J. Farrell MacDonald as Inspector Sullivan
Oscar Apfel as Judge Avery
Sidney Blackmer as King Moss
Eddie Fetherston as James 'Flash' Dawson
Kit Guard as Spud Nolan
James B. Leong as Ching Chu

Soundtrack

External links 

1935 films
1935 crime drama films
American crime drama films
American black-and-white films
Majestic Pictures films
Monogram Pictures films
Films directed by Burt P. Lynwood
1930s English-language films
1930s American films